Glasair Aviation USA, LLC is a Chinese-owned aircraft manufacturer based in Arlington, Washington that produces the Glasair and Sportsman 2+2 line of homebuilt aircraft.  More than 3000 Glasair kits have been delivered worldwide.

History
Tom Hamilton began flight testing the Glasair TD and founded Stoddard-Hamilton Aircraft in 1979. Glasair Aviation was formed in 2001 when Thomas W. Wathen purchased the Glasair assets from bankrupt Stoddard-Hamilton Aircraft, Inc. and signed an agreement with Arlington Aircraft Development, Inc. (AADI) to buy all rights to and assets of the GlaStar model.

In July 2012 the company was sold to the Jilin Hanxing Group, which formed a new company Glasair Aircraft USA, LLC. The company indicated that it intended to certify the Glastar design and otherwise retain production in Arlington, Washington. Its chairman said that purchasing Glasair was "the first step in a very long journey" and envisioned the company producing trainers for flight schools and eventually personal aircraft for the Chinese market.

Randy Lervold became the company CEO on 14 May 2019.

Due to the COVID-19 pandemic, the company laid off its production and builder-assist staff, retaining ten employees for product support and engineering. It planned to take orders in 2021,  and the company web sites states that it is taking limited orders for possible fulfilment in 2023.

Aircraft

See also
Plane Driven PD-1, experimental modification to allow the aircraft to be roadable.

References

External links

 

Homebuilt aircraft
Aircraft manufacturers of the United States
Companies based in Arlington, Washington
Manufacturing companies established in 1979